Jonathan Fast (born April 13, 1948) is an American author and social work teacher.

Life and career

Fast was born in New York City. He attended Princeton University, and earned graduate degrees at Columbia University and Yeshiva University. He has a daughter, Molly Jong-Fast, from his first marriage to author Erica Jong, and two sons from his marriage to Barbara Fast, a Unitarian minister.

Fast's nonfiction book, Ceremonial Violence: A Psychological Explanation of School Shootings (2008), analyzes five school shootings from a psychological perspective: Cleveland Elementary School shooting (San Diego), the Columbine High School shooting, the shootings at Simon's Rock College, the Bethel Regional High School shooting, and the Pearl High School shooting.

, Fast is an associate professor of social work at the Wurzweiler School of Social Work at Yeshiva University.

His father, Howard Fast (1914–2003), was the author of many best-selling novels, including Spartacus (1951), which became the basis for the 1960 film of the same name.

Publications

 Science fiction
 The Secrets of Synchronicity (1977)
 Mortal Gods (1978)
 The Inner Circle (1979)
"Prisoner of the Planets" (1980)
 The Beast (1981)
 Other fiction
 The Golden Fire (1986)
 The Jade Stalk (1988)
 Stolen Time (1990)
 Adaptations
 Newsies (1992)
 Non-fiction
 Ceremonial Violence: a psychological explanation of school shootings (2008). 
 Beyond bullying : breaking the cycle of shame, bullying, and violence (2015).

References

External links

1948 births
Living people
Yeshiva University faculty
20th-century American novelists
Writers from New York City
Writers from Rhode Island
Writers from Greenwich, Connecticut
People from Westerly, Rhode Island
Jewish American novelists
American science fiction writers
American male novelists
Columbia University School of Social Work alumni
Princeton University alumni
Yeshiva University alumni
20th-century American male writers
Novelists from New York (state)
Novelists from Connecticut
21st-century American Jews